Nuvsvåg Chapel is a chapel of the Church of Norway in Loppa Municipality in Troms og Finnmark county, Norway. It is located in the village of Nuvsvåg. It is an annex chapel for the Loppa parish which is part of the Alta prosti (deanery) in the Diocese of Nord-Hålogaland. The white, wooden chapel was built in a long church style in 1961.

See also
List of churches in Nord-Hålogaland

References

Loppa
Churches in Finnmark
Wooden churches in Norway
20th-century Church of Norway church buildings
Churches completed in 1961
1961 establishments in Norway
Long churches in Norway